The 2022–23 Buffalo Bulls men's basketball team represented the University at Buffalo in the 2022–23 NCAA Division I men's basketball season. The Bulls, led by fourth-year head coach Jim Whitesell, played their home games at Alumni Arena in Amherst, New York as members of the Mid-American Conference. As the sixth seed in the MAC tournament they lost to Akron in the first round to finish the season 15–17 and 9–9 in the MAC.  A few days late on March 11, 2023, after four seasons and a 70–49 record, Whitesell was fired as the Buffalo head coach.

Previous season

The Bulls finished the 2021–22 season 19–11 and 13–6 in MAC play to finish in fifth place.  They lost to Akron in the first round of the MAC tournament.

Offseason

Departures

Incoming transfers

Recruiting class

Roster

Schedule and results

|-
!colspan=9 style=|Exhibition

|-
!colspan=9 style=|Non-conference regular season

|-
!colspan=9 style=| MAC regular season

|-
!colspan=9 style=| MAC tournament

Source

References

Buffalo Bulls men's basketball seasons
Buffalo Bulls
Buffalo Bulls men's basketball
Buffalo Bulls men's basketball